Caroline Helena Armington (1875–1939) was a Canadian born artist.

Armington worked in a number of mediums including a large body  of etchings (551). Her main practice consisted of painting and printmaking. In addition to being an artist, she also trained at Guelph General Hospital as a nurse.

Biography
Caroline Helena Wilkinson was born on September 11, 1875 in Brampton, Ontario, Canada. From 1892 to 1899 she took art studies under J. W. L. Forster. She traveled to New York in 1899, where she worked as a nurse. The following year she sailed to Europe and married Frank Armington. She moved back to Canada during 1900–01.

From 1905 to 1910, the couple returned to study in Paris at the Académie de la Grande Chaumière and Académie Julian. In 1908, Caroline's painting Paysanne Hollandaise was accepted at the Salon des Artistes Francais' annual exhibition, held at the Grand Palais, Paris. They assisted the American Ambulance Hospital in Paris from 1914 to 1918, with Caroline working as a nurse and Frank as an orderly. Armington's etching of Bayeux Cathedral was the May 1924 cover of Brooklyn Life magazine. According to the magazine article, collections of her etchings were in the following museums at the time: Luxembourg and Petit Palais, Paris; British Museum and South Kensington Museum, London; Bibliographic de Belgique, Brussels; Liege; New York Public Library; and National Gallery of Canada, Ottawa, Canada.

Armington left Paris in 1939 and moved to New York. She died there on October 25, 1939.

References

Sources and further reading 
  A listing of 257 etchings (out of 551 printed by the artist) drawn from the Peel Art Gallery Museum + Archives collection. The standard monograph and catalogue, with thorough descriptions of hundreds of prints.  Note - this is not a complete catalogue as it only lists the prints in the collection of the Peel Art Gallery at the time of publication.

External links 
 www.artistarchive.com  A catalogue of over 550 prints, many with images.
 pamascollection The Caroline and Frank Armington Collection at Peel Art Gallery Museum + Archives
Caroline Armington etchings  A compilation of 635 titles of Caroline Armington etchings (from Caroline Armington etching record books and other sources)
Public Collections(Museums, galleries, libraries and public collections which have one or more Caroline Armington’s prints in their collection)
Signatures (A compilation of Caroline Armington’ signatures and initials found on her prints)

1875 births
1939 deaths
Canadian women painters
Canadian etchers
20th-century Canadian painters
American women printmakers
20th-century Canadian women artists
20th-century American printmakers
Women etchers
Canadian emigrants to the United States
20th-century American women artists